Kamiondžije ('Truckers') is a 1972–1973 Yugoslav TV series. It follows the adventures of truck drivers Paja and Jare.

Radio Television of Serbia original programming
1973 Yugoslav television series debuts
1973 Yugoslav television series endings
1970s Yugoslav television series
Serbian-language television shows
Television shows set in Serbia
Television shows set in Belgrade
Television shows filmed in Serbia
Television shows filmed in Belgrade